Cathy Burnham Martin (born May 10, 1954) is an American author, voiceover artist, actress, and former television news anchor.  She has authored more than twenty books, including the humorous human training manual “A Dangerous Book for Dogs” and “Of the Same Blood: Your Eurasian Heritage,” which reflects on her grandmother's life drama and her Armenian-European-American heritage.  Martin produces and narrates audiobooks for both fiction and nonfiction titles. She is noted for creating the KISS™ Keep It Super Simple cookbook series.  A member of the Actors' Equity Association since 1994, she was a 20+ year professional member of the National Speakers Association since 1995, where she is referred to as “The Morale Booster.”

Early life 
Born in Goffstown, New Hampshire, Catherine Ann Burnham is the middle child of Robert and Glenna Burnham.  Before graduating from Goffstown High School in 1972, Cathy represented the Granite State in the America's Junior Miss Pageant in Mobile, Alabama as New Hampshire's Junior Miss.

She studied Speech and Theatre at Stetson University in DeLand, Florida, before transferring to Southern New Hampshire University (then New Hampshire College) in 1974. As a student, she made her professional acting debut in 1974 in a New Hampshire Repertory Theatre production of "The Miracle Worker" to re-open the historic Palace Theatre (Manchester, New Hampshire). Burnham says among her most important college experiences were serving a 1974 summer internship in Copenhagen, Denmark, and representing the state again as Miss New Hampshire 1975 in the Miss America Pageant in Atlantic City, New Jersey.  She graduated in 1976 with a Bachelor of Science degree in Marketing.

Career 
While still in college, Martin traveled as soloist and public relations director for the “I Like the U.S. of A.” National Touring Company. She then served as a marketing rep, recruiting students for Boston's Burdett School.  She continued recruiting at Southern New Hampshire University, where she also coached cheerleading, directed plays, and coordinated the tour guides.

In 1983 she hosted her first telethon for Easter Seals of New Hampshire, which led to her being hired by WMUR-TV (ABC) in Manchester, New Hampshire.  As Special Projects Coordinator she produced and hosted a number of documentaries and television specials for the ABC affiliate, along with reporting and anchoring the nightly lifestyles and entertainment reports.

In 1987 she originated WMUR's “5:30 Live” on location news magazine program, before taking over the 6 and 11 o’clock anchor desk in 1988.  By the time she left WMUR-TV in 1994, Martin had accumulated numerous NH Broadcasting Association awards for documentaries, specials, and news coverage as well as accolades as the State's favorite media personality.  She also anchored at WABU-TV in Boston, Massachusetts, and managed the PEG community access station BCTV in Bedford, NH. Under her leadership, BCTV won its first awards from the Northeast Alliance for Community Media, capturing 6 awards for excellence, and topping other stations from New England, New York, and New Jersey.

A business speaker, Burnham's SpeakEasy 123™, involved corporate communications coaching and video production. The talent division also enabled her to resume her professional acting and voiceover endeavors.

In 1998, she was recognized as a contributing author of “The Communications Coach: Tips from the Pros,” which featured her “Taming the Media Monster.”  By 2005 the book “A Healthier You” was published, featuring her “Healthy Thinking Habits” along with interviews from Billy Blanks and Deepak Chopra.  Her first solo book was released in 2007.  “Dog Days in the Life of the Miles-Mannered Man” was also released as an Audiobook in 2016.  In 2017 Quiet Thunder Publishing released "The Bimbo Has Brains," Martin's life lessons book focused on stereotypes, double standards, and relationships. In 2022, she received the Silver Literary Titan Award for "Destiny of Determination: Faith and Family," book 2 in the Destiny historical fiction trilogy.

Along with voiceover work, Cathy Burnham Martin continues to write books, along with articles for the GoodLiving123.com blog, which she has written since May, 2011.

References 

1954 births
Living people
American writers
Stetson University alumni
Southern New Hampshire University alumni
Northeastern University alumni